Asim Saha (born 20 February 1949) is a Bangladeshi poet and novelist. He received Bangla Academy Literary Award in 2011 for his contributions in poetry. In recognition of his contribution to Bengali language and literature, the government of Bangladesh awarded him the country's second highest civilian award Ekushey Padak in 2019.

Early life
Saha was born on 20 February 1949 in his uncle's house in Netrokona district of the then East Pakistan (now Bangladesh). His paternal residence is in Shivalaya Upazila of Manikganj District. His father Akhil buddha Saha was a professor. Saha completed his Secondary education in 1965 and Higher Secondary education from Madaripur Government Nazimuddin College in 1967. In 1973, he obtained his post-graduate degree from the university of Dhaka.

Career
Saha's writing career started in 1964.

Awards 
 Bangla Academy Literary Award (2011)
 Ekushey Padak (2019)

References

1949 births
Living people
Bangladeshi male writers
Bangladeshi Hindus
Recipients of Bangla Academy Award
Recipients of the Ekushey Padak
People from Netrokona District